Erich Stoschek (14 February 1903 – 5 February 1985) was a German athlete. He competed in the men's javelin throw at the 1928 Summer Olympics.

References

1903 births
1985 deaths
Athletes (track and field) at the 1928 Summer Olympics
German male javelin throwers
Olympic athletes of Germany
Place of birth missing